New Shoreham may refer to:

 New Shoreham, Rhode Island, United States
 Part of Shoreham-by-Sea, West Sussex, England 
 New Shoreham (UK Parliament constituency) 1295–1885

See also
 Shoreham (disambiguation)